Sunderland is a community located approximately 100 km northeast of Toronto, Ontario in Brock Township, in the Regional Municipality of Durham, Ontario, Canada.

Business and commerce
Sunderland has a community of small businesses that focus primarily on the needs of surrounding rural families. Downtown Sunderland also has a number of restaurants, drug store, dog groomer, grocery and bottle store, hardware store, an art gallery, a museum (Sunderland & District Historical Society), bank, post office and a branch of the Royal Canadian Legion.

History

The land that the Town of Sunderland was built on, was granted in the early 1820s to United Empire Loyalists. (Sir Isaac Brock's Estate was given  of free land in the vicinity). Sunderland slowly grew around the Brock Hotel - a popular overnight stop for travelers that was owned by Lorenzo Jones. The first post office was called Brock and was run by Andrew Hill; it was located just north at the modern junction of Highway 12 and 7th Concession.

Sunderland was originally called Jones Corners, as both Arch and Lorenzo Jones owned property in what became the downtown core. They produced a town plan and it was renamed Sunderland by 1871 when the Toronto - Lindsay Line of the Toronto and Nipissing Railway was built. The town's population grew rapidly during this time. (Vroomanton, a larger village to the west was bypassed by the railway, and its population subsequently dropped).

Sunderland's name is thought to come from Charles Spencer, the Third Earl of Sunderland in England. He was the Secretary of State, and he helped move Palatine German families to London and then, with Queen Anne's aid, to Ireland in the early 18th century. Many of the men in these families had ancestors who fought for Britain in the American War of Independence in 1776 and in the War of 1812 in the New World, and so, in 1818, after the wars, for their efforts, they were granted free land in what was to become Brock Township, Ontario. These early Palatine settlers included surnames like: Shier, Baker, Bagshaw, Switzer, Lowe, St. John, Lodwick, Brethour and Doble.

Hurricane Hazel struck Sunderland in 1954, and another storm in 1957 destroyed the skating arena and tore out many trees. 
Although the railway ceased operations through Sunderland in the 1980s, the town has remained vibrant, due in no small part to its close proximity to Toronto, Lindsay, and Newmarket.

Geography

The region around Sunderland is rolling farmland, with dense first-growth deciduous forests and rich agricultural soil.  Sunderland displays many typical traits of a temperate humid climate.  Its altitude and proximity to the Canadian Shield allows for much deciduous forests with beginning sprouts of coniferous trees.

Education

Sunderland has one public school, Sunderland Public School, which celebrated its 50-year anniversary on 20 October 2007. The nearest high school is Brock High School, located west of Cannington.

Sports

Sunderland is home of the Brock Minor Hockey Association and the Sunderland Skating Club www.sunderlandskatingclub.com

Events

Sunderland hosts the annual Maple Syrup Festival at the beginning of April each year.  The town also hosts the annual Sunderland Agricultural Fall Fair in September of each year.  This fair has been held annually since the 1850s and is the longest continuously running fair in Ontario.  As well, Sunderland hosts Orange Parades with the Orange Order, usually during the month of July.

Service clubs

Sunderland has been home to a local Lions Club since 1955. As of 2011 the club has approximately 60 members which puts it amongst the largest in its Lions International District known as A-16. The club runs various fundraisers throughout the year such as a Car Draw and Beach Volleyball tournament as well as annually hosting a Blue Rodeo concert. All profits from these events are put back into service projects and used for the purpose of community betterment. One of the club's largest service projects is the annual Sunderland Lions Music Festival which is held over 3 weeks, beginning in mid-April.

Nearby communities
Beaverton, north
Oakwood, east
Pefferlaw, northwest
Vroomanton, west
Port Perry, southeast
Uxbridge, southwest
Cannington, northeast

Transportation
Highway 7/12 
GO Bus 81, Connecting Sunderland to Whitby GO Station

Other information

Area code: +(00)1-705
Postal code: L0C 1H0

There are about 30 homes on the extreme south-west corner of Brock Township with (rural route) Sunderland mailing addresses and a 905 North American area code.

References

External links
Sunderland
Sunderland at Geographical Names of Canada

Communities in the Regional Municipality of Durham